Didier Pierre Jean-Paul Desprez (born 13 March 1999) is a French professional footballer who plays as goalkeeper for  club Paris 13 Atletico, on loan from Belgian First Division A club Charleroi.

Club career
On 2 June 2017, Desprez signed his first professional contract with Lens. He joined Drancy on loan for the 2018–19 season in the Championnat National. He made his professional debut with Lens in a 2–1 Coupe de la Ligue win over Troyes on 13 August 2019.

On 31 August 2021, he signed a two-year contract with Charleroi in Belgium. On 13 July 2022, Desprez joined Paris 13 Atletico in Championnat National on loan.

References

External links

 
 
 
 

1999 births
Living people
Footballers from Lille
French footballers
France youth international footballers
Association football goalkeepers
RC Lens players
JA Drancy players
Paris FC players
R. Charleroi S.C. players
Paris 13 Atletico players
Ligue 2 players
Championnat National players
Championnat National 2 players
French expatriate footballers
Expatriate footballers in Belgium
French expatriate sportspeople in Belgium